This list of notable coffeehouse chains catalogues the spread and markets share of coffeehouses world-wide. This list excludes the many companies which operate coffeeshops within retail establishments, notably bookstores and department stores, or restaurants or convenience stores which also serve coffee. These chains frequently engage in coffee wars to gain brand and consumer market share. Starbucks, Dunkin', and Tim Hortons are the three largest coffee companies in the world, respectively. The largest coffee houses typically have substantial supply-chain relations with the world's major coffee-producing countries. They collectively wield prominent influence in global coffee economics by setting commodity prices, maintaining value chains, and supporting developing economics.

List

See also

 Coffee wars
 List of bakery cafés
 List of coffee companies
 List of doughnut shops
 Lists of restaurants

References

Coffeehouse
Coffee organizations

no:Kaffebar
sv:Kaffebar
zh:连锁咖啡店列表